Speckled garden eel can refer to two species of fishes:

 Gorgasia galzini (Galzin's garden eel) – West and Central Pacific
 Heteroconger pellegrini (Mimic garden eel) – East Pacific